Sofian may refer to:

Alternative of given name Sofiane
Sofian Benzaim (born 1980), better known as Sofian, Norwegian soul artist of Algerian origin 
Səfiyan, (also Saf’yan and Sofian), a village in the Lachin Rayon of Azerbaijan
Sofian (Iran), a town in the East Azerbaijan Province of Iran